Bad Girl is a 2016 Australian thriller drama written and film directed by Fin Edquist, starring Sara West, Samara Weaving, Ben Winspear, Felicity Price and Rebecca Massey.

Synopsis
Seventeen-year-old Amy plans to escape the care of her adoptive parents, who approve of her friendship with local girl Chloe. However, when Amy discovers a dark secret about the seemingly perfect Chloe, she finds herself fighting for her life and the family she tried to leave.

Cast
 Sara West as Amy Anderson
 Samara Weaving as Chloe Buchanan
 Ben Winspear as Peter Anderson
 Felicity Price as Michelle Anderson
 Rebecca Massey as Detective Daniels

Release
The film premiered at the Melbourne International Film Festival on 11 August 2016. It was released theatrically in Australia on 27 April 2017 by Curious Film.

Reception
John Noonan of FilmInk rated the film $16.25 out of $20.00 and wrote that it "manages to be unbearably tense".

Luiz H. C. of Bloody Disgusting rated the film 3.5 skulls out of 5 and called it "thoroughly entertaining" and "remarkably solid".

Cindy Shi of Pelican wrote that the "universally relevant themes of family belonging, trust, and betrayal" allow the film to "transcend the boundary of an Australian independent film, to one capable of an international reception."

Craig Mathieson of The Age rated the film 3 stars out of 5 and wrote that the film "twists perceptions of adolescent camaraderie, attraction, and family's grip, with just enough shocks to allay the familiar conclusion."

References

External links
 
 
 

2016 directorial debut films
2016 independent films
2016 thriller drama films
2010s Australian films
2010s teen drama films
Australian independent films
Australian teen drama films
Australian thriller drama films
Films shot in Perth, Western Australia
Teen thriller films